
Christianity is a minority faith in Shanghai, a municipality in China.

Shanghai has the highest proportion of Catholic residents of any province-level division in Mainland China (2003). The Roman Catholic Diocese of Shanghai has churches including St. Ignatius Cathedral of Shanghai and She Shan Basilica. Shanghai has far more Christians than Jews. The Konrad-Adenauer-Stiftung, which is close to the governing party Christian Democratic Union (Germany) of Germany, has an office in Shanghai.

List of Protestant missionaries in Shanghai 
Below is a selection of historic Protestant missionaries in Shanghai:

Young John Allen
William Jones Boone
William Jones Boone, Jr.
Joseph Edkins
Frederick Rogers Graves
Walter Russell Lambuth
William Lockhart
Walter Lowrie
Walter Henry Medhurst
William Muirhead
Francis Lister Hawks Pott
Samuel Isaac Joseph Schereschewsky
James Hudson Taylor
Matthew Tyson Yates

See also 
 Shanghighlander
 Christianity in Shanghai's neighbouring provinces
 Christianity in Jiangsu
 Christianity in Zhejiang

References

External links
List of Shanghai churches